Jonathan Larkin (born January 30, 1984) is an American former politician who served as a Democratic member of the Arizona House of Representatives from 2013 to 2017. Larkin enlisted in the Marines out of high school after participating in JROTC. He participated in the invasion of Iraq, then served a tour of duty in the Philippines and another tour in Iraq. In addition to serving in the legislature, Larkin also worked for Fry's Food Stores.

Electoral history
 2016 – Incumbent Larkin ran for reelection, while McCune-Davis retired from the Legislature. Larkin placed third behind Democratic primary challengers Ray Martinez and Tony Navarrete. Martinez and Navarrete went on to win the general election.
 2014 – Incumbents Jonathan Larkin and Debbie McCune-Davis were unopposed in the Democratic primary. Michael Gidwani and John Lyon were unopposed in the Republican primary. Larkin and McCune-Davis defeated Gidwani, Lyon and Angel Garcia (I) in the general election.
 2012 – Larkin and incumbent Debbie McCune-Davis defeated Mike Snitz in the Democratic primary on August 28, 2012. They won the general election on November 6, 2012.

References

External links
 
 
 Twitter account

1984 births
21st-century American politicians
Living people
Democratic Party members of the Arizona House of Representatives
Military personnel from Arizona
People from Glendale, Arizona
United States Marine Corps personnel of the Iraq War
United States Marines